The Lake of the Arbuckles is a reservoir located in southern Oklahoma,  southwest of Sulphur in Murray County. It also supplies water to the cities of Sulphur, Davis, Wynnewood and a large oil refinery near Wynnewood. The lake also provides flood control, fish and wildlife habitat and recreation opportunities.

Project timeline
During the early 1950s, a drought seriously depleted then-existing water supplies for the cities and towns in the Arbuckle area. Bureau of Reclamation representatives began meeting in 1956 with local officials about the feasibility of an Arbuckle water project. The proposed project was supported by the Oklahoma Congressional delegation. The Bureau prepared a preliminary development plan in 1961. Public Law 87-594, approved August 24, 1962 (76 Stat. 395) authorized the Arbuckle Project. The final development plan was completed in 1964. A contract to construct Arbuckle Dam was awarded June 9, 1964, and completed June 30, 1966. The project also incorporated certain other infrastructure. These included an aqueduct and pumping system to supply water to area customers, The contract for this construction was awarded August 27, 1965, and the work was completed in 1968. The Bureau turned over the operation and maintenance responsibilities to the Arbuckle Master Conservancy District on January 1, 1968.

Description of dam and lake
Arbuckle Dam, creating Lake of the Arbuckles, was built by the United States Bureau of Reclamation on Rock Creek. at the confluence of Buckhorn, Guy Sandy, and Rock Creeks. The lake is very scenic, nestled within the Chickasaw National Recreation Area.

Water delivery systems
The Arbuckle project included a pumping station downstream from the dam and a  pipeline to deliver water to Davis and  Wynnewood.

Recreation
The Oklahoma Department of Wildlife Conservation has rated the lake as the best for bass fishing in the state.  The lake features 36 miles of shoreline.  Fishing is permitted year-round for crappie, catfish, largemouth bass, white bass and bluegill.  Facilities include three campgrounds for tents and RVs, picnic areas, public restrooms and boat docks and ramps.

Included within the Chickasaw National Recreation Area managed by the National Park Service, the Oklahoma Department of Wildlife Conservation provides wildlife management.

References

External links

 Bureau of Reclamation - Listing of Arbuckle Lake Facilities
 Lake of the Arbuckles - Video footage of the area and a list of local activities and resources.
 
 Lake of the Arbuckles information, photos and videos on TravelOK.com Official travel and tourism website for the State of Oklahoma
 Oklahoma Digital Maps: Digital Collections of Oklahoma and Indian Territory
 Arbuckle Project. U. S. Department of the Interior. Bureau of Reclamation. 
  Southcentral Region Oklahoma Department of Wildlife Conservation. Lake of the Arbuckles Fisheries Management Plan. Retrieved July 25, 2013.

Dams in Oklahoma
Arbuckles
Protected areas of Murray County, Oklahoma
United States Bureau of Reclamation dams
Dams completed in 1966
Infrastructure completed in 1968
Bodies of water of Murray County, Oklahoma
1968 establishments in Oklahoma